HSwMS Gotland was a seaplane cruiser of the Swedish Navy built by Götaverken.

The design of the ship started out in December 1926 as a seaplane carrier with room for twelve aircraft. When presented with the design, Sweden's Naval Construction Board decided that it wanted the ship to have cruiser and minelaying functions as well as operating as a seaplane carrier. The resulting 5,000-ton design presented in January 1927 proved impossible to build within the available budget of Sk16.5 million. The design was then reduced in size requiring one of the forward turrets be removed. Its guns were then placed in casemates either side of the superstructure, a feature otherwise found only in the American Omaha class cruisers. The construction contract for the ship was issued on 7 June 1930.

Its aircraft complement consisted of six Hawker Osprey seaplanes. It had capacity for eight and attempts were made to purchase two more, unsuccessfully since production of the type had ceased. The aircraft were found to suffer from wave damage during rough weather, often forcing the ship to return to port.

During World War II Gotland sighted the German battleship Bismarck when it broke out of the Baltic Sea. The sighting was reported to Swedish Navy headquarters. The report was passed to the British naval attache in Stockholm, who forwarded it to the Admiralty, triggering the Battle of the Denmark Strait and the allied chase of the great battleship.

HSwMS Gotland was converted in 1944 to an anti-aircraft cruiser due to a lack of modern seaplanes. This involved the removal of the seaplanes and catapults and installation of a new deck from amidships to the stern to support light anti-aircraft guns. This included the addition of four 40 mm Bofors guns in M/40 twin mountings (2 power operated and stabilized with on-mount ballistic computers and water cooled guns, 2 twin hand worked mountings with air cooled guns), a pair of Bofors M/32 twin 25mm aft and one atop the forward turret, and two Bofors M/40 20mm L/70 guns. The Ospreys continued in service from harbour bases with the last being retired on 2 December 1947.

After World War II she served as a training ship. Starting 1953 and finishing in 1954 she was modified to allow her to serve as a  fighter direction ship in the event of war as well as a training ship in peacetime. She was decommissioned in 1956, struck off in 1960, sold in 1962 and finally scrapped in 1963.

Captains
1936–1937: Helge Strömbäck
1937–1938: Gösta Odqvist
1938–1938: Erik Samuelson
1944–1945: Moje Östberg
1946–1947: Henning Hammargren
1947–1949: Erik Friberg
1950–1951: Sven Hermelin
1955–1956: Magnus Hammar

References

Bibliography

External links

"From Northern Waters" 1936 Flight article on Gotland's aircraft operations
World Aircraft Carriers List: Sweden
Swedish Ship Involved - Aircraft Cruiser - HMS Gotland 
Gotland Class - Data

Cruisers of the Swedish Navy
Ships built in Gothenburg
German battleship Bismarck
1933 ships
World War II cruisers of Sweden